Russell (Russ) Gamester, born on January 9, 1965, in Lombard, Illinois, is an American auto racing driver.

A long time competitor in United States Auto Club (USAC) racing, Gamester collected the USAC National Midget title in 1989.  Now residing in Peru, Indiana, he competes in the USAC Silver Crown Series. He passed his IRL rookie test at Texas Motor Speedway in 2000. He attempted to complete rookie orientation for the 2000 Indianapolis 500 in a Dreyer & Reinbold Racing car, but failed to complete the test.

IRL IndyCar Series

External links

1965 births
American Speed Association drivers
Living people
People from Lombard, Illinois
People from Peru, Indiana
Racing drivers from Chicago
Racing drivers from Illinois
USAC Silver Crown Series drivers